Impatiens jerdoniae is a species of flowering plant in the family Balsaminaceae. It is native to the Western Ghats of India. It was described and named by Robert Wight and commemorates Flora Jerdon, wife of Thomas C. Jerdon. It grows on rocks and as an epiphyte on trees.

References

jerdoniae
Flora of Kerala
Flora of Tamil Nadu